Pachybathron kienerianum is a species of sea snail, a marine gastropod mollusk, in the family Cystiscidae.

Distribution
This marine species occurs off Venezuela.

References

External links
 Petit de la Saussaye S. (1838). Description de trois espèces nouvelles des genres Carocolle, Pleurotome et Marginelle. Revue Zoologique, par la Société Cuviérienne. (1838): 20

kienerianum
Gastropods described in 1838
Cystiscidae